The Paranoia Agent anime series features an extensive cast of characters created by Satoshi Kon. The series takes place in Musashino, Tokyo, focusing on the serial street assaults caused by an unknown assailant known as Lil' Slugger, and the numerous persons who are affected by them.

Main characters

Tsukiko is a character designer who created the popular character Maromi. She is allegedly the first victim of Lil' Slugger's attacks. At the end of the series, it is revealed that she had also unconsciously created Lil' Slugger. When she was younger, the dog Maromi was based on her real dog who was killed after wandering away from Tsukiko-(when she accidentally let go of its leash) and getting hit by a car. Not wanting to upset her father, Tsukiko claimed the dog was killed by a boy on roller blades carrying a bat, which would later manifest itself as Lil' Slugger.

An enigmatic serial assailant who appears to be a sixth-grade elementary student and is identifiable by his golden roller blades, baseball cap and bent golden baseball bat. He appears before people who are mentally pushed into a corner and attacks them with his bat. He is later shown not to be human, but is instead a mysterious entity who grows stronger with the power of rumour and speculation. It is revealed at the end to be the creation of Tsukiko, who imagined him to avoid blame for the death of her dog. 

 Maromi is a character appearing as a pink puppy created by Tsukiko Sagi who has accumulated a large degree of popularity among the masses. Maromi was modeled after a dog that Tsukiko owned in her youth. She also serves as Tsukiko's conscience. 

The chief detective in charge of investigating the Lil' Slugger case. He is a tough middle-aged man with a critically ill wife and doesn't believe in the supernatural.

A detective assisting Keiichi Ikari in the Lil' Slugger case and doubling as his foil in personality. Unlike Keiichi, he is a lot more intrigued by some of the stranger aspects of the case, often bringing himself closer to insanity in order to solve the case.

Supporting characters

A homeless woman who dwells near the scene of Lil' Slugger's attack on Tsukiko, of which she is a witness.
 

Keiichi Ikari's wife. She is seriously ill but, despite her illness, she wants to live and remains faithful to her husband. When Lil' Slugger appears before her, she manages to fight him off with her own willpower. She later passes away from a heart attack, but not before managing to free Keiichi from a delusional world.

A senile hospital patient who possesses the ability to predict and identify all of Lil' Slugger's victims.

A gossip journalist attempting to cover the Lil' Slugger case. He is indebted to the Old Man's son after causing a traffic accident involving the Mysterious Old Man and is forced to pay his hospital bills as consolation. He becomes Lil' Slugger's second victim while attempting to interrogate Tsukiko Sagi and gather information for his next article. He is skilled in impressions and demonstrates this talent to Tsukiko by flawlessly mimicking her co-workers.

A cool-natured and narcissistic elementary school student who lives near the scene of the original Lil' Slugger attacks. His personal tutor is Harumi Chōno, whom he is emotionally close to. He is initially popular due to his intelligence and athleticism, but because of his golden roller blades and baseball cap, he becomes associated with the recent Lil' Slugger attacks and becomes the subject of ostracism. Following Lil' Slugger's attack on Shōgo Ushiyama (whom he disliked for stealing his popularity), he secludes himself into his room and is reduced to a delusively paranoid state before becoming Lil' Slugger's third victim.

An elementary school student who transferred to Yūichi's school on the advice of his school counselor to positively assert himself. He does so by running for the office of school president. Yūichi believes Shōgo to be a two-faced schemer who is behind the current attacks on Yūichi's reputation to boost his own popularity, when in reality he is a kindhearted youth who seeks to better himself by being positive and helpful whenever he can. He becomes the victim of a Lil' Slugger imposter while on his way home from school.

An office lady who works as a personal tutor for Yūichi Taira. Harumi possesses an alternate personality named , who works as a prostitute. The two personalities communicate via an answering machine. After being engaged and married to her superior Akihiko Kase (voiced by Toshio Kobayashi and Lance J. Holt), Harumi repeatedly attempts to repress the manifestation of Maria, which proves futile. In the apex of her conflict with Maria, Harumi becomes Lil' Slugger's fourth victim.

A corrupt police chief who often watches his daughter Taeko undress through the use of a hidden surveillance camera. He attempts to have a new house built for his family using illegally obtained money to fund the project. He manages to arrest a Lil' Slugger imposter when an attack attempt is made on him. The house he attempts to build is eventually destroyed in a landslide brought on by a typhoon. He is fond of women and is a regular customer of the prostitute Maria. He later becomes Lil' Slugger's fifth victim.

A middle schooler under the impression that he is a holy warrior when he is in fact a lunatic unable to distinguish reality from his fantasies. He is arrested under suspicion of being behind the Lil' Slugger attacks, although he soon confesses that the only ones he attacked were Shōgo and Masami. He is soon killed by the real Lil' Slugger, becoming his seventh victim.

The only daughter of Masami Hirukawa. She is seen to be very close to her father, admiring him deeply. After discovering her father's disgusting actions, she becomes Lil' Slugger's sixth victim and contracts amnesia as a result of the attack.

A trio of people, a young girl, an old man and a tall gay man, who meet up from the internet to perform a suicide pact together.

Mellow Maromi Staff
The production staff of Mellow Maromi, an anime that features Maromi as the main character.

 and 

The two most prominent members of the staff who are the production managers. Saruta is an incompetent and clumsy slacker who constantly causes problems for the production, resulting in a highly stressful work environment, while Oda is a short-tempered man who frequently assaults and humiliates Saruta whenever he makes a mistake. The two gradually become unhinged as production goes on, and after Oda angrily fires Saruta, Saruta beats him to death and takes the finished copy of the first episode, planning to drive it to the studio, only to be pursued by Lil Slugger, who suddenly appears in the back of his car and beats him to death. Saruta’s corpse is later found outside the network station.

Other characters

An otaku and a regular customer of Maria. He makes short appearances in the first and third episodes, as well as the twelfth.

A Yakuza member affiliated with Masami Hirukawa.

A sadistic lackey of Junji Handa who attempts to collect 2,000,000 yen from Masami to give to Handa as a token of congratulations for his engagement. When Masami is unable to provide this amount within the given deadline, Makabe increases the debt to 5,000,000 yen.

References

Paranoia Agent
Paranoia Agent